Elizabeth A. Pearce (born 1952/1953) is an American politician from Vermont who served as Vermont State Treasurer.

Biography
Beth Pearce resides in Barre.  She received her Bachelor of Arts degree from the University of New Hampshire.

She was appointed Vermont State Treasurer by Governor Peter Shumlin in January, 2011.  Pearce succeeded Jeb Spaulding, who was appointed Secretary of Administration.

Beginning in 2003, Pearce served as Vermont's Deputy Treasurer.
 
Prior to her appointment as Deputy Treasurer, Pearce served as Deputy Treasurer for Cash Management in the office of the Massachusetts State Treasurer (1999–2003); Deputy Comptroller for the Town of Greenburgh, New York; and as the Accounting Manager and Financial Operations Manager for the Town of West Hartford, Connecticut.

Pearce also served as a fiscal officer with the Massachusetts Department of Social Services and as a project director for the Massachusetts Office of Human Services.

On July 23, 2019, she officially endorsed Bernie Sanders' presidential campaign.

Electoral history

Notes

External links
Government website
Campaign website

1950s births
21st-century American politicians
21st-century American women politicians
Living people
People from Barre, Vermont
State treasurers of Vermont
University of New Hampshire alumni
Vermont Democrats
Women in Vermont politics